The Model Husband is a 1956 West German comedy film directed by Erik Ode and starring Harald Juhnke, Inge Egger and Theo Lingen. It is a remake of the 1937 film The Model Husband, which was itself based on a 1915 play Fair and Warmer by Avery Hopwood.

Cast

References

Bibliography

External links 
 

1956 films
1956 comedy films
German comedy films
West German films
1950s German-language films
Remakes of German films
Films directed by Erik Ode
1950s German films
German films based on plays
German black-and-white films